Emmanouil "Manolis" Mylonakis (born 9 April 1985) is a Greek former water polo player who competed in the 2008 Summer Olympics and 2012 Summer Olympics. He was also a member of the team that competed for Greece at the 2016 Summer Olympics. They finished in 6th place.

He plays for Greek powerhouse Olympiacos, with whom he won the 2017–18 LEN Champions League. His sister Anthoula Mylonaki was also a Water Polo Olympian, winning a silver medal with Greece in 2004.

Titles 

9 Greek Championships 

10 Greek Cups

1 Greek Super Cup

1 LEN Champions League

See also
 Greece men's Olympic water polo team records and statistics
 List of World Aquatics Championships medalists in water polo

References

External links
 

1985 births
Living people
Greek male water polo players
Olympiacos Water Polo Club players
Olympic water polo players of Greece
Water polo players at the 2008 Summer Olympics
World Aquatics Championships medalists in water polo
Water polo players at the 2012 Summer Olympics
Water polo players at the 2016 Summer Olympics
Mediterranean Games medalists in water polo
Mediterranean Games bronze medalists for Greece
Competitors at the 2013 Mediterranean Games
Water polo players from Chania

Ethnikos Piraeus Water Polo Club players